Ho-Kwang (Dave) Mao (born June 18, 1941) is a Chinese-American geologist. He is the director of the Center for High Pressure Science and Technology Advanced Research in Shanghai, China. He was a staff scientist at Geophysical Laboratory of the Carnegie Institution for Science for more than 30 years. Mao is a recognized leading scientist in high pressure geosciences and physical science. There are two minerals named after him, Davemaoite and Maohokite.

Biography
Mao was born in Shanghai in 1941. His father, General Mao Sen (毛森), was a high-ranking official of the intelligence department of the Republic of China. When Mao was seven years old, he moved to Taiwan with his family, fleeing with the rest of the government of the Republic of China to the province. Mao received his BS from  National Taiwan University in 1963. Mao further pursued his studies in the United States, and obtained MS in 1966 and PhD in 1968 from the University of Rochester, New York.

From 1968 to 1972, Mao did his postdoctoral research at the Geophysical Laboratory of the Carnegie Institution of Washington (CIW). From then on Mao has spent his career at Geophysical Laboratory as a Senior Staff scientist. 

In 2013, Mao founded Center for High Pressure Science and Technology Advanced Research in his birthplace, Shanghai. He takes the director role at the center and leads a group of international scientists to tackle world-class scientific challenges. The center has a Nature index of 17.68 in 2021 and was on an increasing trend since 2016.

Mao has three daughters - Cyndy, Linda, and Wendy. His youngest daughter, Wendy Mao, is a professor of geological sciences at Stanford University.

Research

Achieving high pressure and pressure calibration methods 
Mao is one of the most prolific users of the diamond anvil cell for research at high pressures. Although at the time the claim was controversial, his work with Peter M. Bell is now generally accepted as being the first verified static pressure in excess of 1 Megabar.

Mao and colleagues first calibrated ruby fluorescence pressure scale to 80 GPa and this method has been widely used in almost every diamond anvil cell experiments. This work has been cited by 3921 times as of Jan 15, 2022, according to google scholar.

In 2018, 400 GPa was achieved by his team and a detailed description of pressure loading and distribution, gasket thickness variation, and diamond anvil deformation was reported.

Towards metallic hydrogen 
Mao is a pioneer in experimentally exploring the possible metallic hydrogen phase under high pressure.  His work on solid hydrogen starts in 1988, where he reported single-crystal structure of hydrogen up to 26.5 GPa. He later published a review paper on transitions in solid hydrogen in 1994. In 1996, his team's work suggested a more compressible solid hydrogen than previously thought. More recently in 2019, his team published results on single crystal diffraction of the lightest material in the world, hydrogen, up to 254 GPa and revealed isostructural electronic transitions in solid hydrogen at around 220 GPa.

Superconductivity 
In 1987, Mao and a colleague at the Geophysical Laboratory, Robert Hazen, identified the composition and structure of the first high-temperature superconductor to have a critical temperature above the boiling point of liquid nitrogen.

Iron peroxide in Earth's interior 
Mao discovered formation of FeO2Hx from goethite FeOOH or from iron-water reaction under Earth's lower mantle conditions. The novel FeO2Hx phase processes a pyrite structure. Since this phase can contain varied amount of hydrogen, it would have important implications for the deep water cycle.

Honors and awards

 1979, Fellow of the Mineralogical Society of America
 1979, the Mineralogical Society of America Award
 1987, Fellow of the American Geophysical Union
 1989, the P. W. Bridgman Award, from the AIRAPT International
 1990, the Arthur L. Day Prize, from the United States National Academy of Sciences
 1993, Member of the United States National Academy of Sciences
 1994, Academician of the Academia Sinica, Taiwan
 1994, Fellow of the American Physical Society
 1996, Foreign Member of the Chinese Academy of Sciences
 1996, Fellow of the Geochemical Society
 2002, Chinese government Friendship Award
 2005, the Balzan Prize for Mineral Physics (with Russell J. Hemley)
 2005, the Gregori Aminoff Prize, from the Royal Swedish Academy of Sciences
 2005, the Roebling Medal, from the Mineralogical Society of America
 2007, the Inge Lehmann Medal, from the American Geophysical Union
 2008, Foreign Fellow of the Royal Society of London
In 2021, davemaoite, a mineral found only in the deep mantle of the earth, was named after Mao. It is estimated to make 5–7% of the Earth's lower mantle.

References

External links 
 CV and publications
Carnegie Institution for Science

1941 births
Living people
American geologists
Chinese emigrants to the United States
Fellows of the American Geophysical Union
Foreign members of the Chinese Academy of Sciences
Foreign Members of the Royal Society
Members of Academia Sinica
Members of the United States National Academy of Sciences
National Taiwan University alumni
Scientists from Shanghai
University of Rochester alumni
High pressure science
Taiwanese people from Shanghai